Castle Rock Springs was a resort Lake County, California built around a group of mineral springs, including one hot spring with relatively high volumes of water.

Former names include Mills Hot Springs, Mills' Mineral Springs, Noble's Springs, Castle Springs, Castle Hot Springs,  Verdant Vales, Camp Houdd Gibson and Houdd Gibson Camp.

Location

Springs

As of 1910 basins had been excavated and cemented at two hot springs a few yards apart in a ravine that feeds Putah Creek.
The water was mildly sulphurated, but otherwise only slightly mineralized.

This water was piped to the bath house and the swimming tank.
Other springs on the property, with their temperature, were: Sour, ; Black Sulphur, ; White Sulphur, ; Vangas, .
Much hydrogen sulfide escaped from the bank around Vangas.

History

The springs were located about 1885 by W. Mills.
They were formerly known as Mills Springs or Noble's Springs.
The property  was run as a small resort where the hot water was used for bathing and the water of the cool sulfur springs for drinking.
In the summer of 1910 the property had recently changed ownership and the resort was being improved.
This included construction of a hotel, a bathhouse with a swimming plunge, and a dancing pavilion.
Several tent cottages would also provide accommodations.

The Castle Springs post office operated here from 1911 to 1917.
As of 1913 the property had been in litigation, but was now owned by Mrs. Campbell-Van Luven, who had stated that it would be reopened for the 1914 season.
A fine cement-lined swimming pool  has been built recently
The hotel and cottages could accommodate 75 visitors.

The Castle Rock Springs Geothermal Steam Area has a large geothermal resource of steam at high temperature and moderate pressure several thousand feet below the surface.
It is adjacent to The Geysers, which has been heavily developed for geothermal generation. 
An environmental impact report for a project in the area was issued in August 1975.
The Camp Verdant Vales school is in the center of the area, and Anderson Springs borders the area to the east.
At the time of study tourist resorts that were once operative in the area had closed, although some were now being used by specialized private religious communities.

References

Sources

 

Springs of Lake County, California
Resorts in Lake County, California